Juan José Castillo Barreto (born 3 October 1955), better known as just Juani, is a Spanish footballer. He competed in the men's tournament at the 1976 Summer Olympics.

References

External links
 
 

1955 births
Living people
Footballers from Las Palmas
Spanish footballers
Spain B international footballers
Spain under-21 international footballers
Olympic footballers of Spain
UD Las Palmas players
CD Málaga footballers
RCD Mallorca players
La Liga players
Segunda División players
Segunda División B players
Footballers at the 1976 Summer Olympics
Association football midfielders